Station P was a British base camp at the head of Mateev Cove on the east side of Hannah Point, Livingston Island in the South Shetland Islands, Antarctica that supported survey, geology and biology field work from 29 December 1957 until 15 March 1958. The camp was occupied by a six-member team led by Hugh Simpson. The surveyed areas included parts of Byers Peninsula, Elephant Point, Ioannes Paulus II Peninsula and Hurd Peninsula.

A hut intended for erection on the site failed to reach its destination, as the ship RRS Shackleton transporting it was damaged by the ice and parts of the hut were used in the ship's repair. As a result, the plans for a more permanent British presence on the island failed to materialize.

The area was visited by early 19th century sealers frequenting nearby Johnsons Dock.

Location

See also
 Hannah Point
 Livingston Island
 List of Antarctic research stations
 List of Antarctic field camps
 Crime in Antarctica

Maps
 G.J. Hobbs. Map showing the physiography, geological station numbers and the survey routes on Livingston Island. In: The geology of Livingston Island . Scientific Report No. 47. British Antarctic Survey, 1963. Figure 1
 L.L. Ivanov et al. Antarctica: Livingston Island and Greenwich Island, South Shetland Islands. Scale 1:100000 topographic map. Sofia: Antarctic Place-names Commission of Bulgaria, 2005
 L.L. Ivanov. Antarctica: Livingston Island and Greenwich, Robert, Snow and Smith Islands. Scale 1:120000 topographic map.  Troyan: Manfred Wörner Foundation, 2009.  
 Antarctic Digital Database (ADD). Scale 1:250000 topographic map of Antarctica. Scientific Committee on Antarctic Research (SCAR). Since 1993, regularly upgraded and updated
 L.L. Ivanov. Antarctica: Livingston Island and Smith Island. Scale 1:100000 topographic map. Manfred Wörner Foundation, 2017.

In fiction

The idea of having a seasonal base camp supporting field work in Hannah Point area is exploited in the 2016 Antarctica thriller novel The Killing Ship by Simon Beaufort.

Notes

External links
 

Geography of Livingston Island
British Antarctic Territory
British Antarctic Survey
Outposts of Antarctica
1957 establishments in Antarctica
1958 disestablishments in Antarctica